The following is a list of the top thirty exports of Italy. Data is for 2012, in millions of United States dollars, as reported by The Observatory of Economic Complexity.

References
 atlas.media.mit.edu - Observatory of Economic complexity - Products exported by Italy (2012)

Italy
Exports
Foreign relations of Italy
Foreign trade of Italy